Jeong Nam-gyu (April 17, 1969 – November 22, 2009) was a South Korean serial killer, who from 2004 to 2006 killed 14 people.

Crimes 
On January 14, 2004 in Bucheon, Gyeonggi Province, he kidnapped, raped and then murdered two people. He then continued to murder people in Gyeonggi and Seoul, including the murder of a woman returning home late at night. He murdered mainly in the southern part of Seoul, including Shin-gil, Guro and Gwanak. His reason for killing a male elementary school student after sexually assaulting him was that he himself was abused by a man as a child.

On April 26, 2006, he was arrested at the end of a fight in which he tried to kill a man and the man's father. Subsequent investigations revealed that he also murdered a man at Imun-dong. Before Jeong confessed this murder,  serial killer Yoo Young-Chul falsely confessed that he also had committed it. On April 12, 2007, he was sentenced to death by the Supreme Court and detained in Seoul Detention Center. 

On the morning of November 21, 2009, a jail employee discovered Jeong had attempted to hang himself from a noose made from a plastic bag. He was rushed to the hospital, but died the following morning.
His crimes were also depicted in 2022 South Korean drama, Through the Darkness.

List of crimes 
January 14, 2004: Yoon Ki-hyun, 13, and Im Young-gyu, 12, were kidnapped, raped, and then strangled to death.
January 30, 2004: Won Kyung-ja, 44, was stabbed but survived.
February 6, 2004: Jeon Hyo-sil, 24, was stabbed to death. Yoo Young-chul falsely confessed to this murder.
February 10, 2004: Son Young-ran, 28, was stabbed to death.
February 13, 2004: Seo Eun-jung, 30, was stabbed but survived.
February 25, 2004: Hong Son-young, 29, was stabbed but survived.
February 26, 2004: Park Bok-soon, 17, was stabbed but survived.
April 8, 2004: Jeong Yong-soo, 25, was stabbed to death.
April 22, 2004: Kim Young-hee, 20, was stabbed to death.
May 5, 2004: Choi Joo-myung, 22, was stabbed but survived.
May 9, 2004: Kim Hyun-jin, 24, was stabbed to death.
August 4, 2004: Ahn Sung-chul, 50, was bludgeoned with a blunt weapon after Jeong broke into his house. He survived.
April 6, 2005: Kang Ye-eun, 71, and Han Li-na, 13, were bludgeoned with a blunt weapon after Jeong broke into the house they were staying at. He then set the residence on fire. Both victims survived.
April 18, 2005: Hwang Hye-soo, 46, and his daughter Min-chul, 12, were bludgeoned with a blunt weapon after Jeong broke into their house. Both victims survived.
May 30, 2005: Kim Young-soon, 41, was stabbed to death.
June 4, 2005: Kim Joo-hee, 36, was bludgeoned with a blunt object after Jeong broke into her house. She survived.
October 9, 2005: Hong Hye-jin, 39, was attacked but survived.
October 19, 2005: Byun Yu-jung, 26, was molested and then strangled to death after Jeong broke into her house. He then set the residence on fire.
January 14, 2006: Jeong broke into a house and sexually assaulted a 7-year-old girl. He was scared off by her father.
January 18, 2006: Jeong broke into a house and bludgeoned Song Jin-hee, 17, with a blunt object before he strangled her to death. He then did the same thing to her siblings, Min-young, 21, followed by Seok-gu, 12.
March 27, 2006: Kim Jin-young, 25, and her sisters, Young-suk, 21, and Eun-hee, 13, were attacked after Jeong broke into their home. Only Eun-hee survived.
April 22, 2006: Kim Yong-soo, 24, was bludgeoned with a blunt weapon after Jeong broke into his house. He survived.

See also
List of serial killers by country
List of serial killers by number of victims

References

See also 

 Yoo Young-chul
 Kang Ho-sun
 Chijon family
1969 births
2009 suicides
Male serial killers
People from Jangsu County
Serial killers who committed suicide in prison custody
South Korean people convicted of murder
South Korean rapists
South Korean serial killers
Suicides by hanging in South Korea